Abdi Behravanfar (Persian : عبدی بهروانفر, born June 1975) is an Iranian singer-songwriter in Rock, country blues  and Folk Blues style . He is founder of MUD band in Mashhad  . He plays Guitar, Harmonica and Dotar( Persian folk lute).He learned Dotar with Bakshi Almajughi in Ghouchan a city in north of Khorassan.

Behravanfar has produced nearly 40 Songs, in 5 studio albums and the others as singles. The two albums "Shalamroud" and "Kokheo & Kalakhet" released by two production companies in the United States.The first one by Bamahang production and the second album released by Zirzamin production. In 2012 "White Dwarf" and in 2013 "Sorrow", released by CD Baby. He also has performed as a film-score player for short films.

He produced and released the album of master Bakhshi Almajughi in 2017; also produced a documentary about Bakshi Almajughi.

Early career
Abdi( Abdollah) Behravanfar was born in Mashhad, Iran in June 1975. At age of 12 listening to "Roll on" a song created by Alabama country band he found himself interested in playing guitar. When he was 22 he went to Tehran he bought a Guitar and started learning new lessons in playing the instrument. After returning to Mashhad he formed MUD band.

He was mostly influenced by music legends such as Jimi Hendrix and Jim Morrison in Rock music; Son House, Muddy Waters and Sonny Boy Williamson in Blues Neil Young and Ian Anderson  and Khorasani Folk.

Discography

Studio albums
Shalamroud (2008)
Track Listing
"Faryade Feshordeh" – 4:13
"Agha Ghazanfar" – 5:30
"Toop-e-Toop" – 2:48
"Shalamroud" – 5:44
"Marde Sardo Garm Keshideh" – 5:40
"Kargare Bad-Bakht" – 	5:48
"Kenare Jo" – 3:50
"Be Saram Zad" – 5:02
"Gorge Balan Rideh" – 4:09
"Baghe Vaba Gerefteh" – 6:10

Kokheo & Kalakhet (2009)
Track Listing
"Roghi" – 6:54
"Zadim Be Khunash" – 4:27
"In!?" – 5:46
"Pesar Amoo Joon" – 4:28
"Nahange Khaam" – 3:50
"Soog" – 4:29
"Gap" – 4:45
"Mostafa" – 5:50

White Dwarf(2012) 19:48
Sorrow (2013)
Track Listing
"News" – 4:35
"Spring " – 4:19
"Alang & Dolang" – 6:32
"Sorrow" – 4:45
"Your Mood" – 5:30
"Atop The Mountains" – 5:20
"Spider" – 7:02
"Calm Down" – 6:10
"Gone Down The Alley" – 3:50

Ejaze (2020)
"Agha Ghazanfar 
"Shabe Man
"Raftam Sare Kuche
"Kargare Badbakht 
"Shalamroud
"Marde Sardo
"Gorge Balan Reede 
"Pesar amou joon 
"Vagh Vaghe Sag 
"Jabre Zamune 
"Kenare Joo
"Ghuze Bla Ghuz

Tokhm E Talaa (2021)
"Roghi (Instrumental)
"Alang o Dolang 
"Bahaar 
"Deladang 
"Kajaaye Khoshk
"Gham
"Lalaee
"Tokhm e Talaa 
"Nahang e Khaam 
"Pesar Amoo Joun 
"Sar be Sar 
"Shaayad 
"Soog
"Tanhaa Aamadam 
"Be Sahraa
"Roghi

Singles
"Shaayad" – 6:25
"Fiuz-e- sukhteh" – 5:26
"Esfandiar-e Maghmoum" – 9:35
"Gap" – 4:44
"lalayee" – 6:26
"Ejazeh" – 3:45
"Dela Dangom"

External links
Abdi Behravanfar's Official Website
Abdi Behravanfar's Official Facebook Page
Abdi Behravanfar Biography
Abdi Behravanfar at Last.fm
a profile on Abdi Behravanfar in Persian and English On wordpatch.com

1975 births
Living people
21st-century Iranian male singers
Iranian songwriters
People from Mashhad
Iranian rock musicians
Iranian guitarists
Iranian composers
Iranian blues singers
21st-century guitarists